Bogoslovni vestnik, subtitled Theological Quarterly, Ephemerides Theologicae, is a quarterly peer-reviewed academic journal on theology published by the Faculty of Theology of the University of Ljubljana. It is the oldest Slovenian scholarly journal in the field of humanities. Articles are in English, French, German, Italian, Latin, or Slovenian. The journal is abstracted in Religious and Theological Abstracts.

See also 
 List of academic journals published in Slovenia

References

External links 
 

Religious studies journals
Publications established in 1920
Multilingual journals
Quarterly journals
University of Ljubljana publications
1920 establishments in Slovenia
Academic journals of Slovenia